The Maryland Eastern Shore Hawks women's basketball team represents University of Maryland Eastern Shore in Princess Anne, Maryland, United States. The school's team currently competes in the Mid-Eastern Athletic Conference.

History
Maryland Eastern Shore began play in 1981, with their transition to Division I happening during the 1981–82 season. They have never won the MEAC title, though they reached the Final in 2015, losing to Savannah State 65–47.

References

External links
 Official website